Saint Sabina was a saint and martyr of the early church. Her feast day is 29 August. She lived and suffered martyrdom at the beginning of the 2nd century in Rome.

Narrative

Sabina was the daughter of Herod Metallarius and the wealthy widow of Senator Valentinus, originally from Avezzano in the Abruzzo region of Italy.

Sabina converted to Christianity due to the example of her Syrian slave Serapia. The widow then withdrew with a few devout friends to one of her country seats, where she spent her time doing good works. Serapia was denounced and beheaded in the city of Vindena in the state of Umbria. Sabina rescued her remains and had them interred in the family mausoleum where she also expected to be buried. Sabina was initially discharged out of regard to her quality and friends; but some time later was denounced as well, and accused of being a Christian by Elpidio the Prefect. She was thereupon martyred in Rome around the year 126 AD.

In 430 her relics were brought to the Aventine Hill, to the newly erected basilica Santa Sabina on the site of her house, originally situated near a temple of Juno.  This house may also have formed an early Christian titular church. The church was initially dedicated to both Sabina and Serapia.

Commentary
According to Klemens Löffler, writing for the Catholic Encyclopedia, the Acts of the martyrdom have no historic value. Maya Maskarinec suggests that "'Sabina'...was most plausibly the donor who had provided the titulus with property on the Aventine." Often this was a private home to be used as a church. When someone donated property or money, the resulting foundation bore their name. The passio that developed during the sixth to eighth century becomes attached to the memory regarding a late fourth or early fifth century philanthropist. "Gradually, however, throughout Rome, many of the tituli's donors metamorphosed into their communities' patron saints."

References

External links

 

126 deaths
2nd-century Christian saints
Year of birth unknown
Ante-Nicene Christian female saints
2nd-century Christian martyrs
2nd-century Roman women
Italian saints
Executed ancient Roman women
2nd-century Romans
People of Abruzzese descent
Converts to Christianity from pagan religions